Brooke Dolan II (1908 – Chongqing, China, August 19 or 29, 1945) was an American adventurer and naturalist in the 1930s and 1940s. His father was Brooke Dolan, a wealthy American industrialist in Philadelphia. During World War II, he served as a lieutenant and captain.

Overview 

Brooke Dolan II was educated at Princeton University and Harvard University. He was a trustee of the Academy of Natural Sciences in Philadelphia. He led two expeditions to China and eastern Tibet in 1931 to 1932 and 1934 to 1936. The first expedition comprised Ernst Schäfer, a German zoologist, Gordon Bowles, Otto Gneiser, and Hugo Weigold. The second comprised Schäfer and Marion Duncan, an American missionary. Dolan's second expedition may have been motivated partly by the need to take a leave of absence from Philadelphia society after a January 1934 arrest on disorderly conduct charges.

On April 15, 1934, Dolan married Emilie Campan Gerhard, daughter of Albert Pepper Gerhard, of Overbrook, Philadelphia who accompanied him for a while on his second trip to China.

Dolan joined the United States Army Air Forces after the attack on Pearl Harbor. In 1942 he traveled to Lhasa with Ilia Tolstoy, a grandson of Leo Tolstoy, as a member of the Office of Strategic Services (OSS), to meet with the Tibetan government. On December 20, 1942, they met the young 14th Dalai Lama and his Regent, the 3rd Taktra Rinpoche. They were the first Americans ever to meet a Dalai Lama. Tolstoy and Dolan, who were nicknamed "Mud" and "Slug" by their fellow OSS officers, both received the Legion of Merit for the mission. They are considered to have gone beyond their authority in leading the Tibetan government to believe the United States had given international political recognition to Tibet. Photographs taken by Dolan and Tolstoy on their expedition were published in A Portrait of Lost Tibet by Rosemary Jones Tung.

After the Tibetan expedition Dolan transferred from the OSS to the Army Air Forces and joined the United States Military Observer Group in Yunnan, China. Dolan died in Chongqing, China. According to some accounts, he was killed on an OSS mission to rescue downed Allied bomber crews; according to other accounts, he took his own life on August 19, 1945.

References 

Sources

 Dolan, Brooke, II Road to the Edge of the World, Frontiers; October 1936, pp. 5–9
 Dolan, Brooke, II Road to the Edge of the World, Proceedings of the Academy of Natural Sciences (Philadelphia), 1937
 Duncan, Marion, The Yangtze and the Yak, Alexandria VA, 1952
 Hale, Christopher, Himmler’s Crusade, Hoboken NJ: Wiley & Sons, 2003
 Knaus, John Kenneth, Orphans of the Cold War: America and the Tibetan Struggle for Survival, Chapter 1, New York: Public Affairs, 1999

External links

1908 births
1945 deaths
American explorers
American naturalists
People of the Office of Strategic Services
Recipients of the Legion of Merit
United States Army Air Forces officers
20th-century naturalists
1945 suicides
United States Army Air Forces personnel of World War II
American expatriates in China